Lady Constance Georgina Bulwer-Lytton (12 February 1869 – 2 May 1923), usually known as Constance Lytton, was an influential British suffragette activist, writer, speaker and campaigner for prison reform, votes for women, and birth control. She used the name Jane Warton to avoid receiving special treatment when imprisoned for suffragist protests.

Although born and raised in the privileged ruling class of British society, Lytton rejected this background to join the Women's Social and Political Union (WSPU), the most militant group of suffragette activists campaigning for "Votes for Women".

She was subsequently imprisoned four times, including once in Walton gaol in Liverpool under the nom de guerre of Jane Warton, where she was force fed while on hunger strike. She chose the alias and disguise of Jane Warton, an "ugly London seamstress", to avoid receiving special treatment and privileges because of her family connections: she was the daughter of a viceroy and the sister of a member of the House of Lords. She wrote pamphlets on women's rights, articles in The Times newspaper, and a book on her experiences, Prisons and Prisoners, which was published in 1914.

While imprisoned in Holloway during March 1909, Lytton used a piece of broken enamel from a hairpin to cut the letter "V" into the flesh of her breast, placed exactly over the heart. (The "V" came from "Votes for Women", as she had planned to scratch the whole phrase "beginning over the heart and ending it on [her] face".)

Lytton remained unmarried, because her mother refused her permission to marry a man from a "lower social order", while she refused to contemplate marrying anyone else.

Her heart attack, stroke, and early death at the age of 54 have been attributed in part to the trauma of her hunger strike and force feeding by the prison authorities.

Early life and family

Lytton was the third of seven children of Robert Bulwer-Lytton, 1st Earl of Lytton and Edith Villiers. She spent some of her early years in India, where her father was the Governor-General; it was he who made the proclamation that Queen Victoria was the Empress of India. Her siblings were:
Edward Rowland John Bulwer-Lytton (1865–1871)
Lady Elizabeth Edith "Betty" Bulwer-Lytton (12 June 1867 – 28 March 1942). Married Gerald Balfour, 2nd Earl of Balfour, brother of the future Prime Minister Arthur Balfour.
Henry Meredith Edward Bulwer-Lytton (1872–1874)
Lady Emily Bulwer-Lytton (1874–1964). Married the architect Edwin Lutyens. Associate and confidante of Jiddu Krishnamurti.
Victor Bulwer-Lytton, 2nd Earl of Lytton (1876–1947), married Pamela Chichele-Plowden, an early flame of Sir Winston Churchill, who had met her while playing polo at Secunderabad.
Neville Bulwer-Lytton, 3rd Earl of Lytton (6 February 1879 – 9 February 1951)

In the early years in India, Lytton was educated by a series of governesses and reportedly had a lonely childhood. She apparently met Winston Churchill while living in India, where he was an unsuccessful rival to her brother Victor for the hand of Pamela Chichele-Plowden. She is reported to have said: "The first time you see Winston Churchill you see all his faults, and the rest of your life you spend discovering his virtues." Although she grew up in England surrounded by many of the great artistic, political and literary names of the day, she rejected the aristocratic way of life. After her father died, she retired from public view to care for her mother, rejecting attempts to interest her in the outside world.

Lytton remained unmarried until her death; in 1892 her mother refused her permission to marry a man from a "lower social order". For several years she waited in vain for her mother to change her mind, while refusing to contemplate marrying anyone else.

In 1897 her aunt, Theresa Earle, published her gardening guide Pot-Pourri from a Surrey Garden. She had been encouraged to write this by Lytton who typed some of the text. The book sold quickly and well and in one of the later editions Lytton added a section on Japanese flower arranging.

Lytton became a vegetarian in 1902 and was an advocate of animal rights.

Women's suffrage
The reclusive phase of Lytton's life started to change in 1905 when she was left £1,000 in the estate of her great-aunt/godmother, Lady Bloomfield. She donated this to the revival of Morris dancing and her family records state that "Her brother Neville suggested that she gave it to the Esperance Club, a small singing and dancing group for working class girls", where part of their remit was teaching Morris dancing. The Esperance club was founded by Emmeline Pethick-Lawrence and Mary Neal in response to distressing conditions for girls in the London dress trade.

(1908) Conversion to suffragette cause
Between September 1908 and October 1909 Constance Lytton's conversion to the militant suffragette cause was complete. On 10 September 1908 she wrote to Adela Smith:

She subsequently met other suffragettes, including Annie Kenney and Emmeline Pethick-Lawrence, at the Green Lady Hostel and on a tour of Holloway prison. On 14 October 1908, she wrote to her mother:

In Prison and Prisoners, she stated: "Women had tried repeatedly, and always in vain, every peaceable means open to them of influencing successive governments. Processions and petitions were absolutely useless. In January 1909 I decided to become a member of the Women's Social and Political Union (WSPU)." Working for the WSPU she made speeches throughout the country, and used her family connections to campaign in Parliament. She wrote to the Home Secretary Herbert Gladstone asking for Emmeline Pankhurst and Christabel Pankhurst to be released from prison.

(1909) Imprisonment and self-injury in Holloway

Lytton was imprisoned in Holloway prison twice during 1909, after demonstrating at the House of Commons, but her ill health (a weak heart) meant that she spent most of her sentence in the infirmary. When the authorities discovered her identity, the daughter of Lord Lytton, they ordered her release. The British government were also aware that her health problems and hunger striking could lead to martyrdom. Infuriated by such inequality of justice she wrote to the Liverpool Daily Post in October 1909 to complain about the favourable treatment she had received.

On 24 February 1909, Lytton wrote to her mother about prison and reform in Prisons and Prisoners:

While she was imprisoned in Holloway Prison during March 1909 she started to deliberately injure her body. Her plan was to cut "Votes for Women" from her breast to her cheek, so that it would always be visible. But after completing the "V" on her breast and ribs she requested sterile dressings to avoid blood poisoning, and her plan was aborted by the authorities. Lytton wrote of the self-injury action in Prisons and Prisoners:

(1909) Imprisonment in Newcastle
In October 1909 Constance Lytton was arrested for a second time in Newcastle. She had thrown a stone wrapped in paper bearing the message "To Lloyd George – Rebellion against tyranny is obedience to God – Deeds, not words". Her message was in response to the government's new policy of force-feeding imprisoned suffragettes who were on hunger strike.

(1910) Jane Warton in Liverpool, Walton gaol

In January 1910, convinced that poorer prisoners were treated badly, Lytton travelled to Liverpool disguised as a working-class London seamstress named Jane Warton. In disguise she spoke at an event with Jennie Baines and Patricia Woodlock and led a procession to the Prison Governor's house demanding the "stain" of force-feeding be removed from Liverpool. She was arrested after an incident of rocks being thrown at an MP's car, imprisoned in Walton gaol for 14 days "hard labour" and force-fed eight times. After her release, although desperately weak, she wrote accounts of her experience for The Times and Votes for Women (the monthly journal of the WSPU, launched in 1907). She went on to lecture on the subject of her experience of the conditions which suffragette prisoners endured. It's thought that her speeches and letters helped to end the practice of force-feeding.

Lytton wrote of the Jane Warton episode in Prisons and Prisoners:

Force-feeding

Lytton's health continued to deteriorate and she suffered a heart attack in August 1910, and a series of strokes which paralysed the right side of her body. Undaunted, she used her left hand to write Prisons and Prisoners (1914), which became influential in prison reform. The book is also notable for making an explicit link between animal rights and women's rights.

Lytton was given a Hunger Strike Medal by the WSPU.

1911 onwards
In June 1911, Lytton's brother had a letter from Ellen Avery, the local school headmistress, and forty-one other "Suffrage women of Knebworth and Woolmer Green", thanking the Lyttons for having "laboured for our Cause" and "for faith in us as Women": seventeen were WSPU signatories, including Constance's own cook Ethel Smith, Dora Spong, and nine who were in the non-militant suffragist NUWSS.

In November 1911 Lytton was imprisoned in Holloway for the fourth time, after breaking windows in the Houses of Parliament, or of a post office in Victoria Street, London. However, conditions had improved, "all was civility; it was unrecognisable from the first time I had been there" and suffragettes were treated as political prisoners.

After the WSPU ended its militant campaign at the outbreak of war in 1914, Lytton gave her support to Marie Stopes' campaign to establish birth control clinics.

In January 1918 parliament passed a bill giving women over 30 the vote if they were married to a property owner or were one themselves.

Death and commemoration

Constance Lytton never fully recovered from her prison treatment, heart attack and strokes, and was nursed at Knebworth by her mother. They lived at Homewood, a house designed by Constance's brother-in-law, Edwin Lutyens. She died in 1923, aged 54, only days after moving out of Homewood to a flat in Paddington, London, in an attempt to restart an active life. At her funeral, the purple, white and green Suffragette colours were laid on her coffin. Her ashes lie in the family mausoleum in Knebworth Park.

Timeline 
Edited extract from the Knebworth House memorial
1869 – Lady Constance Georgina Lytton born.
1880 – Family leaves India.
1887 – Sister Betty marries Gerald Balfour (Arthur's brother).
1897 – Sister Emily marries Edwin Lutyens, the architect.
1908 – Godmother Lady Bloomfield dies, leaving her £1000. Lytton subsequently meets Annie Kenny and Emmeline Pethick-Lawrence.
1909 – Becomes an official member of the WSPU.
1909 – Imprisoned for the first time in February 1909.
1909 – Her pamphlet 'No Votes for Women: A Reply to Some Recent Anti-Suffrage Publications' is published.
1909 – Imprisoned for 2nd time in Holloway in October 1909.
1910 – Disguises herself as Jane Warton and imprisoned for 3rd time in Walton Gaol, Liverpool, in terrible conditions. Force fed several times.
1910 – Writes about her experiences in The Times.
1911 – Imprisoned for the 4th time, in Holloway in November 1911
1912 – Suffers a stroke from which she never fully recovers, but continues to write Prisons and Prisoners: an account of her time in custody.
1914 – Prisons and Prisoners is published.
1918 – Representation of the People Act 1918 gives the vote to all men, and to women over the age of 30.
1923 – Lytton dies aged 54.
1928 – Representation of the People Act 1928 gives the vote to women on the same grounds as men.

See also 
History of feminism
List of suffragists and suffragettes
Shoulder to Shoulder BBC/Warner Bros. Television drama, 1974

Archives
Letter of Constance Lytton are held at The Women's Library at London Metropolitan University, ref  9/21

Notes

References

Bibliography

 Thomas, Sue. 'Scenes in the writing of "Constance Lytton and Jane Warton, spinster" : contextualising a cross-class dresser'. Women's History Review, 12:1 (2003), 51–71. Publisher: Triangle Journals; Routledge. .

External links

 

1869 births
1923 deaths
British vegetarianism activists
British women's rights activists
British feminists
Burials at the Lytton Mausoleum
Daughters of British earls
Eagle House suffragettes
English suffragists
English feminists
English prisoners and detainees
Hunger Strike Medal recipients
Constance
People from Shimla
Prisoners and detainees of England and Wales
Women's Social and Political Union